The Régiment de marche du Tchad (RMT, "Ad hoc Regiment of Chad") is a mechanised unit of the French Army, belonging to the Troupes de Marine. It is part of the 2nd Armoured Brigade. Formerly garrisoned north of Noyon it was moved in July 2010 to Quartier Colonel Dio, Meyenheim, Alsace.

History 

The  was formed in July 1943. It became the infantry regiment of the 2nd Armoured Division.

For instance, its 9th company, commanded by Captain Raymond Dronne, had the Spanish nickname  because it was mainly formed with veterans from the Republican side of the Spanish Civil War. The 9th Company was actually formed in Chad (1941), before the regiment as a whole.

Liberation of Paris 
On August 20, 1944 General Charles De Gaulle received information that a great civilian revolt against the Germans had broken out in Paris. He asked the Allied Supreme Command to send French troops to liberate the capital. Upon being instructed to advance on Paris with the 2nd Division, Leclerc ordered the 9th Armoured Company to march onto Paris as an advance party.

At 21:22 hours the night of August 24, 1944, La Nueve burst into the centre of Paris via the Porte d'Italie. On entering the Town Hall Square, a 9th Company tank, "Ebro", fired the first shots against a large group of German artillery and machine guns. Later, the commander of the 9th Company,  Raymond Dronne,  demanded unconditional surrender from the German commander, Dietrich von Choltitz.

While awaiting the final capitulation, the 9th Company assaulted the Chamber of Deputies, the Hotel Majestic and the Place de la Concorde, suffering just one casualty. At 3:30pm on August 25, the German garrison of Paris surrendered to 9th Company soldiers, who took von Choltilz as a prisoner, while other 2nd Division units began to arrive at the French capital.

The next day, August 26, Allied troops entered Paris in triumph; the 2nd Division marched past Notre Dame de Paris and escorted De Gaulle along the Champs Elysees. The 9th Armoured Company marched under the colours of the Second Spanish Republic.

The  is often associated with the pledge made by Leclerc, then a colonel, never to cease fighting before French colours were flying over the cathedral of Strasbourg. It later took part in the Liberation of Strasbourg, in November 1944.

Post-war

Organization 
The regiment is composed of around 1200 personnel, both military and civilian. Organized into 9 companies.

Compagnie de commandement et logistique (CCL) – command and logistics company
Compagnie d'éclairage et d'appui (CEA) – recce and support company
1er Compagnie de combat mécanisées – 1st combat company
2e Compagnie de combat mécanisées – 2nd combat company
3e Compagnie de combat mécanisées – 3rd combat company
4e Compagnie de combat mécanisées – 4th combat company
Compagnie de base d'instruction (CBI) – training & base company
Compagnie de réservistes – reserve company
Compagnie de réservistes – reserve company

Honours 
Because of the circumstances of its formation, the RMT inherited the honours of the Régiment de Tirailleurs Sénégalais du Tchad; hence, its flag is inscribed with the names of three battles in which its parent took part: Koufra (1941), Fezzan (1942), and Sud-Tunisien (1943). The three other names are those of battles in which the RMT itself took part as such: Alençon (1944), Paris (1944), and Strasbourg (1944).

The RMT was awarded the Ordre de la Libération ("Order of the Liberation") on 12 June 1945, and the Croix de Guerre 1939–1945 with 4 palms; it also sports the Presidential Unit Citation (USA) awarded to the entire 2nd Armoured Division. Consequently, its men wear the fourragère of the Médaille militaire with an "olive" representing the Croix de guerre 1939–1945, and the fourragère of the Ordre de la Libération, since 18 June 1996.

Because the patron saint of the Troupes de Marine is God Himself, all internal ceremonies of the RMT are concluded by the line "Et au Nom de Dieu, vive la coloniale !" ("and in the name of God, long live the Colonials"). It was first uttered by Charles de Foucauld when he saw colonial troops arrive to his rescue when, as a missionary, he found himself in trouble with local tribes.

Flag of the regiment

Its cravat is decorated:

It is a Companion of the Liberation since June 12, 1945 and is also decorated with the Croix de Guerre 1939–1945 with four Palms. The Presidential Unit Citation was awarded to the U.S. 2nd Armoured Division, which it was a part of. It is also entitled to use the fourragère in the colors of the Médaille militaire ribbon with the "olive" of the Croix de Guerre (1939–1945) and since 18 June 1996 to include a fourragère in the colors of the ribbon of the Cross of the Ordre de la Libération. See the List of Companions of the Liberation.

Decorations

Cross of the Liberation.
Presidential Unit Citation.
Croix de guerre 1939–1945 four palms.

Notes

References 
 Erwan Bergot, La coloniale du Rif au Tchad 1925–1980, imprimé en France : décembre 1982, n° d'éditeur 7576, n° d'imprimeur 31129, sur les presses de l'imprimerie Hérissey.

External links

The Spaniards who liberated Paris. Le Monde Diplomatique, August 2004

Military units and formations established in 1943
Marines regiments of France
Infantry regiments of France
Companions of the Liberation
Armoured regiments of France
20th-century regiments of France
21st-century regiments of France